Runar Ullaland Hove (born 8 August 1995) is a Norwegian former footballer who played as a centre-back.

Career
Hove was born in the town of Florø and started his senior career with Florø SK in 2011. He stayed with the club for eight seasons. On 20 December 2018, he signed a three-year contract with Eliteserien club Viking. Despite being sidelined for two months with a knee injury, Hove played regularly throughout the 2019 season, amassing 24 appearances in total. He was also a starter in the victorious cup final against Haugesund the same year. In the third round of the 2020 Eliteserien, he suffered a hamstring injury that would keep him sidelined for the rest of the season. On 26 August 2021, he signed a one-and-a-half-year contract with fellow Eliteserien club Brann. Brann were relegated after a play-off match where Hove was sent off and the match was decided on penalties. He retired after the 2022 season at the age of 27.

Career statistics

Personal life
He is a twin brother of fellow Florø player Erlend Hove.

Honours
Viking
 Norwegian Football Cup: 2019

References

1995 births
Living people
People from Flora, Norway
Sportspeople from Vestland
Norwegian footballers
Florø SK players
Viking FK players
SK Brann players
Norwegian Third Division players
Norwegian Second Division players
Norwegian First Division players
Eliteserien players
Association football defenders
Norway youth international footballers
Twin sportspeople
Norwegian twins